Lowercase is an extreme form of ambient
minimalism where very quiet, usually unheard sounds are amplified to extreme levels. Minimal artist Steve Roden popularized the movement with an album entitled Forms of Paper, in which he made recordings of himself handling paper in various ways. These recordings were commissioned by the Hollywood branch of the Los Angeles Public Library.

Definition
Steve Roden stated this about the lowercase tendencies in which he began to develop in his later works: “It bears a certain sense of quiet and humility; it doesn't demand attention, it must be discovered... It’s the opposite of capital letters—loud things which draw attention to themselves.”

Examples
Artists that have contributed to the lowercase movement include Richard Chartier, Jeremy Leafey, and Carsten Nicolai, a.k.a. Alva Noto.

See also
John Cage
Microsound
Musique concrète
Postminimalism
Tape music

References

External links
Whisper the Songs of Silence (article in Wired)
Is Lowercase Music Even Music?

Ambient music
2000s neologisms
21st-century music genres
2000s in music
Experimental music genres